John Charles "Jack" Simmons (October 8, 1924 – September 17, 1978) was a professional American football offensive lineman who played for eight seasons in the National Football League.

References

External links
NFL.com player page

1924 births
1978 deaths
People from Grosse Pointe, Michigan
American football offensive linemen
Detroit Titans football players
Maryland Terrapins football players
Baltimore Colts (1947–1950) players
Detroit Lions players
Chicago Cardinals players
Eastern Conference Pro Bowl players
Players of American football from Michigan